Dinia is a genus of moths in the family Erebidae. The genus was erected by Francis Walker in 1854.

Species
Dinia eagrus (Cramer, [1779])
Dinia mena (Hübner, [1827])
Dinia subapicalis (Walker, 1854)

References

Euchromiina
Arctiinae of South America
Moth genera